Abu Ishaq Shami (died 940) was a Muslim scholar who is often regarded as the founder of the Sufi Chishti Order. He was the first in the Chishti lineage (silsila) to live in Chisht and so to adopt the name "Chishti", so that, if the Chishti order itself dates back to him, it is one of the oldest recorded Sufi orders. His original name, Shami, implies he came from Syria (ash-Sham). He died in Damascus and lies buried on Mount Qasiyun, where Ibn Arabi was later buried.

Masters and students
Abu Ishaq Shami's teacher was Mumshad Al-Dinawari, whose own teacher was Abu Hubayra al-Basri, a disciple of Huzaifah Al-Mar'ashi who was in turn a disciple of Ibrahim ibn Adham (Abu Ben Adhem In the western tradition.) The Chishtiyyah silsila continued through Abu Ishaq Shami's disciple 
Abu Aḥmad Abdal Chishti. In South Asia Moinuddin Chishti, whose  silsila goes back to Abu Ishaq Shami, was the founding father who brought Chishti teaching to the region and he remains the most revered saint of the Chishti order in India and Pakistan.

Quotes
Some of Abu Ishaq Shami's sayings are:
 “Starvation excels all in bliss.“
 “The worldly people are impure while the dervishes are pure in their souls. These two different natures cannot therefore mingle.”

See also 
 Sufism

References

External links 
 Soofie (Sufi)

Year of birth unknown
940 deaths
Chishtis
Syrian Sufi saints